Chaloner Chute I (died 14 April 1659) of The Vyne, Sherborne St John, Hampshire, was an English lawyer, Member of Parliament and Speaker of the House of Commons during the Commonwealth.

Origins
Chute was the son of Charles Chute of the Middle Temple, a lawyer, by his wife Ursula Chaloner, a daughter of John Chaloner of Fulham in Middlesex.

Career

He was admitted to the Middle Temple and was called to the bar. He developed a great reputation as a defence lawyer in several high-profile cases including those of Sir Edward Herbert (the king's attorney-general), Archbishop Laud, the eleven members of the House of Commons charged by Fairfax and his army as delinquents, and James Duke of Hamilton.  In 1653 he bought from Lord Sandys The Vyne, a very large Tudor manor house in Hampshire. He demolished much of the northern part of the decaying building and employed the architect John Webb, a pupil of Inigo Jones, to add the portico to the north front in the 1650s, the first of its kind on an English country house.

Chute was elected as a Member of Parliament for Middlesex in the Second Protectorate Parliament in 1656, but was prevented from taking his seat. He was elected again for Middlesex to the Third Protectorate Parliament in 1659 and became its first Speaker. However shortly afterwards he stood down because of ill health and died in April 1659.

Memorial

The magnificent memorial to Chaloner Chute was commissioned by his descendent Sir John Chute (d.1776) and designed and created by Thomas Carter the Younger of London. It is made of Carrera marble and cost £335. It was begun in 1775 and completed some time after Sir John's death in 1776.

Marriages and issue
Chute married twice:
Firstly to Anne Skory, a daughter and co-heiress of Sir John Skory/Scory of Wormesley, Herefordshire, and widow of William Place of Dorking, Surrey, by whom he had issue one son and two daughters:
Chaloner Chute II (1632-1666), son and heir, MP for Devizes, who married his step-sister Catherine Lennard, a daughter of Richard Lennard, 13th Baron Dacre.
Anne Chute
Cecilia Chute
Secondly he married Dorothy North, a daughter of Dudley North, 3rd Baron North (1581–1666), and widow of Richard Lennard, 13th Baron Dacre (1596–1630), by whom he had no further issue.

See also
Charles Herbert Cottrell (a descendant)

References

1659 deaths
Speakers of the House of Commons of England
Year of birth missing
English lawyers
17th-century English lawyers
English MPs 1656–1658
English MPs 1659
People from Sherborne St John